is a Japanese scientist known for his work on synthesis and characterization of single-wall and double-wall carbon nanotubes and on encapsulation of water, fullerenes and other organic molecules into carbon nanotubes.

Kataura is the leader of self-assembled nano-electronics group at the National Institute of Advanced Industrial Science and Technology (AIST).

Kataura plot

Kataura plot is a graph relating the energy of the band gaps in a carbon nanotube and its diameter. A nanotube of certain diameter can be metallic M or semiconducting S; it can have several band gaps, conventionally labeled as S11, S22, M11, M22, etc. This property results in multiple branches in the Kataura plot.

The original article on the Kataura plot has been reported in a lesser-known journal Synthetic Metals. Nevertheless, this article has been cited more than 1900 times in peer-reviewed scientific journals between 2000 and January 2020.

References

External links
Official website
Prof. Shigeo Maruyama - Kataura plot calculations

1959 births
Living people
Japanese nanotechnologists
Japanese physicists
University of Tsukuba alumni